The 1920 Mendoza earthquake took place in the province of Mendoza, Argentina, on 17 December at 6:59:49 p.m.

The earthquake was felt with grade VIII (Severe) on the Mercalli intensity scale. It affected the provincial capital Mendoza, and caused material damage and numerous fatalities in several towns  to the northeast.

See also
1782 Mendoza earthquake
List of earthquakes in 1920
List of earthquakes in Argentina
List of historical earthquakes

References
  Instituto Nacional de Prevención Sísmica. Listado de Terremotos Históricos.

1920
Mendoza, 1920